The Pajama Game is an album released on August 12, 1957 by Columbia Records. It contains songs from the movie of the same name, mostly sung by Doris Day and John Raitt. The catalog number was OL-5210.

Track listing
All songs by Jerry Ross and Richard Adler.

"The Pajama Game" (Opening) (Eddie Foy, Jr. and Ensemble)
"Racing with the Clock" (Foy, Jr. and Ensemble)
"I'm Not at All in Love" (Doris Day and the Girls)
"I'll Never Be Jealous Again" (Foy, Jr. and Reta Shaw)
"Hey There" (John Raitt)
"Once-a-Year Day" (Day, Raitt and Ensemble)
"Small Talk" (Day and Raitt)
"There Once Was a Man" (Day and Raitt)
"Steam Heat" (Carol Haney, Kenneth Le Roy and Buzz Miller)
"Hernando's Hideaway" (Haney and Ensemble)
"Seven and a Half Cents" (Day, Jack Straw and Ensemble)
"Finale"

References

1957 soundtrack albums
Doris Day soundtracks
Columbia Records soundtracks
Musical film soundtracks